The University of Washington Husky football team has had over 300 players drafted into the National Football League (NFL) since the league began holding drafts in 1936. Because of the NFL–AFL merger agreement, the history of the AFL is officially recognized by the NFL and therefore this list includes the AFL Draft (1960–1966) and the Common Draft (1967–1969).

Each NFL franchise seeks to add new players through the annual NFL Draft. Generally, the team with the worst record the previous year picks first, the next-worst team second, and so on. Teams that did not make the playoffs are ordered by their regular-season record with any remaining ties broken by strength of schedule. Playoff participants are sequenced after non-playoff teams, based on their round of elimination (wild card, division, conference, and Super Bowl).  See NFL Draft Rules for further detail.

Before the merger agreements in 1966, the American Football League (AFL) operated in direct competition with the NFL and held a separate draft. This led to a massive bidding war over top prospects between the two leagues. As part of the merger agreement on June 8, 1966, the two leagues would hold a multiple round "Common Draft". Once the AFL officially merged with the NFL in 1970, the "Common Draft" simply became the NFL Draft.



Key

Players selected

Notable undrafted players
Note: No drafts held before 1920

References
General

 

 

Specific

Washington Huskies

Washington (state) sports-related lists
Seattle-related lists